Elisha Hughes (born 20 January 1959) is an Antiguan former cyclist. He competed in the points race event at the 1984 Summer Olympics.

References

External links
 

1959 births
Living people
Antigua and Barbuda male cyclists
Olympic cyclists of Antigua and Barbuda
Cyclists at the 1984 Summer Olympics
Place of birth missing (living people)